In enzymology, a biotin-[methylcrotonoyl-CoA-carboxylase] ligase is an enzyme that catalyzes the chemical reaction

ATP + biotin + apo-[3-methylcrotonoyl-CoA:carbon-dioxide ligase (ADP-forming)]  AMP + diphosphate + [3-methylcrotonoyl-CoA:carbon-dioxide ligase (ADP-forming)]

The 3 substrates of this enzyme are ATP, biotin, and [[apo-[3-methylcrotonoyl-CoA:carbon-dioxide ligase (ADP-forming)]]], whereas its 3 products are AMP, diphosphate, and 3-methylcrotonoyl-CoA:carbon-dioxide ligase (ADP-forming).

This enzyme belongs to the family of ligases, specifically those forming generic carbon-nitrogen bonds.  The systematic name of this enzyme class is biotin:apo-[3-methylcrotonoyl-CoA:carbon-dioxide ligase (ADP-forming)] ligase (AMP-forming). Other names in common use include biotin-[methylcrotonoyl-CoA-carboxylase] synthetase, biotin-beta-methylcrotonyl coenzyme A carboxylase synthetase, beta-methylcrotonyl coenzyme A holocarboxylase synthetase, and holocarboxylase-synthetase.  This enzyme participates in biotin metabolism.

References

 

EC 6.3.4
Enzymes of unknown structure